Verpal Singh heads The Sikh Centre, a not-for-profit organisation engaged in promoting greater interaction between Sikhs and the wider New Zealand community. He also runs a small publishing company specialising in niche areas.

Biography
He is a writer, with a novel and a book of analytical essays in the pipeline. Through the Sikh Centre, he has been involved in running three annual competitions in the field of Painting, Short Story Writing, and traditional Punjabi embroidery art of Phulkari. He is an active participant in the ongoing inter-faith dialogue amongst various faith communities of New Zealand. Verpal Singh is a keen student of history, especially religious history.

Works and publications
Verpal Singh has contributed editorially or contributed a chapter to the following books produced by various publishing agencies.
 Sikhism and Civilisation
Author: Daljit Singh; 
 Dynamics of Sikh Revolution
Author: Jagjit Singh; 
 History of the Sikhs and Their Religion
Editor: Kharak Singh; 
 Thoughts of Bhai Ardaman Singh
Editor: Kharak Singh; 
 Who are the Sikhs?
Author: Gurbaksh Singh; Publisher: SGPC, Amritsar
 We are not Symbols
Author: Harjot Oberoi; Publisher: Institute of Sikh Studies, Chandigarh
 Teaching Sikh Heritage to the Youth
Author: Gurbaksh Singh; Publisher: Institute of Sikh Studies, Chandigarh
 Khalsa and the 21st Century
Editor: Kharak Singh; Publisher: Institute of Sikh Studies, Chandigarh
 Dairying and Farm Diversification
Author: GBS Kahlon; Publisher: Punjab Institute for Sustainable Development, Ludhiana

In addition, he has published essays and research articles in AEN Journal, Abstracts of Sikh Studies and The Sikh Review amongst others.

References

Living people
1974 births
New Zealand writers
New Zealand Sikhs
Punjabi people